In chemistry, noble gas compounds are chemical compounds that include an element from the noble gases, group 18 of the periodic table. Although the noble gases are generally unreactive elements, many such compounds have been observed, particularly involving the element xenon. 

From the standpoint of chemistry, the noble gases may be divided into two groups: the relatively reactive krypton (ionisation energy 14.0 eV), xenon (12.1 eV), and radon (10.7 eV) on one side, and the very unreactive argon (15.8 eV), neon (21.6 eV), and helium (24.6 eV) on the other. Consistent with this classification, Kr, Xe, and Rn form compounds that can be isolated in bulk at or near standard temperature and pressure, whereas He, Ne, Ar have been observed to form true chemical bonds using spectroscopic techniques, but only when frozen into a noble gas matrix at temperatures of 40 K or lower, in supersonic jets of noble gas, or under extremely high pressures with metals.

The heavier noble gases have more electron shells than the lighter ones. Hence, the outermost electrons are subject to a shielding effect from the inner electrons that makes them more easily ionized, since they are less strongly attracted to the positively-charged nucleus. This results in an ionization energy low enough to form stable compounds with the most electronegative elements, fluorine and oxygen, and even with less electronegative elements such as nitrogen and carbon under certain circumstances.

History and background

When the family of noble gases was first identified at the end of the nineteenth century, none of them were observed to form any compounds and so it was initially believed that they were all inert gases (as they were then known) which could not form compounds. With the development of atomic theory in the early twentieth century, their inertness was ascribed to a full valence shell of electrons which render them very chemically stable and nonreactive. All noble gases have full s and p outer electron shells (except helium, which has no p sublevel), and so do not form chemical compounds easily. Their high ionization energy and almost zero electron affinity explain their non-reactivity.

In 1933, Linus Pauling predicted that the heavier noble gases would be able to form compounds with fluorine and oxygen. Specifically, he predicted the existence of krypton hexafluoride and xenon hexafluoride, speculated that  might exist as an unstable compound, and suggested that xenic acid would form perxenate salts. These predictions proved quite accurate, although subsequent predictions for  indicated that it would be not only thermodynamically unstable, but kinetically unstable. As of 2022,  has not been made, although the octafluoroxenate(VI) anion has been observed.

By 1960, no compound with a covalently bound noble gas atom had yet been synthesized. This yielded a crystalline product, xenon hexafluoroplatinate, whose formula was proposed to be .
Nonetheless, this was the first real compound of any noble gas.

The first binary noble gas compounds were reported later in 1962. Bartlett synthesized xenon tetrafluoride by subjecting a mixture of xenon and fluorine to high temperature. Rudolf Hoppe, among other groups, synthesized xenon difluoride by the reaction of the elements.

Following the first successful synthesis of xenon compounds, synthesis of krypton difluoride was reported in 1963.

True noble gas compounds

In this section, the non-radioactive noble gases are considered in decreasing order of atomic weight, which generally reflects the priority of their discovery, and the breadth of available information for these compounds. The radioactive elements radon and oganesson are harder to study and are considered at the end of the section.

Xenon compounds

Xenon fluorides react with several other fluorides to form fluoroxenates, such as sodium octafluoroxenate(VI), and fluoroxenonium salts, such as trifluoroxenonium hexafluoroantimonate.

The compound  contains a Xe–Xe bond, which is the longest element-element bond known (308.71 pm = 3.0871 Å).

Krypton compounds

Krypton gas reacts with fluorine gas under extreme forcing conditions, forming  according to the following equation:

The preparation of  reported by Grosse in 1963, using the Claasen method, was subsequently shown to be a mistaken identification.

Argon compounds

The discovery of HArF was announced in 2000. The compound can exist in low temperature argon matrices for experimental studies, and it has also been studied computationally. Argon hydride ion  was obtained in the 1970s.
This molecular ion has also been identified in the Crab nebula, based on the frequency of its light emissions.

Neon and helium compounds

Neon also forms an unstable hydrate. There is some empirical and theoretical evidence for a few metastable helium compounds which may exist at very low temperatures or extreme pressures. The stable cation  was reported in 1925, but was not considered a true compound since it is not neutral and cannot be isolated. In 2016 scientists created the helium compound disodium helide which was the first helium compound discovered.

Radon and oganesson compounds

Radon is not chemically inert, but its short half-life (3.8 days for 222Rn) and the high energy of its radioactivity make it difficult to investigate its only fluoride, its reported oxide, and their reaction products.

All known oganesson isotopes have even shorter half-lives in the millisecond range and no compounds are known yet, although some have been predicted theoretically. It is expected to be even more reactive than radon, more like a normal element than a noble gas in its chemistry.

Reports prior to xenon hexafluoroplatinate and xenon tetrafluoride

Clathrates

Prior to 1962, the only isolated compounds of noble gases were clathrates (including clathrate hydrates); other compounds such as coordination compounds were observed only by spectroscopic means. Clathrates (also known as cage compounds) are compounds of noble gases in which they are trapped within cavities of crystal lattices of certain organic and inorganic substances. The essential condition for their formation is that the guest (noble gas) atoms should be of appropriate size to fit in the cavities of the host crystal lattice; for instance, Ar, Kr, and Xe can form clathrates with crystalline β-quinol, but He and Ne cannot fit because they are too small. As well, Kr and Xe can appear as guests in crystals of melanophlogite.

Helium-nitrogen crystals have been grown at room temperature at pressures ca. 10 GPa in a diamond anvil cell. Solid argon-hydrogen clathrate has the same crystal structure as the  Laves phase. It forms at pressures between 4.3 and 220 GPa, though Raman measurements suggest that the  molecules in  dissociate above 175 GPa. A similar  solid forms at pressures above 5 GPa. It has a face-centered cubic structure where krypton octahedra are surrounded by randomly oriented hydrogen molecules. Meanwhile, in solid  xenon atoms form dimers inside solid hydrogen.

Coordination compounds
Coordination compounds such as  have been postulated to exist at low temperatures, but have never been confirmed.

Hydrates
Hydrates are formed by compressing noble gases in water, where it is believed that the water molecule, a strong dipole, induces a weak dipole in the noble gas atoms, resulting in dipole-dipole interaction. Heavier atoms are more influenced than smaller ones, hence  was reported to have been the most stable hydrate; it has a melting point of 24 °C. The deuterated version of this hydrate has also been produced.

Fullerene adducts

 Noble gases can also form endohedral fullerene compounds where the noble gas atom is trapped inside a fullerene molecule. Under these conditions, only about one out of every 650,000  cages was doped with a helium atom; with higher pressures (3000 bar), it is possible to achieve a yield of up to 0.1%.

Applications

Most applications of noble gas compounds are either as oxidising agents or as a means to store noble gases in a dense form. Xenic acid is a valuable oxidising agent because it has no potential for introducing impurities—xenon is simply liberated as a gas—and so is rivalled only by ozone in this regard. The perxenates are even more powerful oxidizing agents. Xenon-based oxidants have also been used for synthesizing carbocations stable at room temperature, in  solution.

Stable salts of xenon containing very high proportions of fluorine by weight (such as tetrafluoroammonium heptafluoroxenate(VI), and the related tetrafluoroammonium octafluoroxenate(VI) ), have been developed as highly energetic oxidisers for use as propellants in rocketry. 

Xenon fluorides are good fluorinating agents.

Clathrates have been used for separation of He and Ne from Ar, Kr, and Xe, and also for the transportation of Ar, Kr, and Xe. (For instance, radioactive isotopes of krypton and xenon are difficult to store and dispose, and compounds of these elements may be more easily handled than the gaseous forms.) In addition, clathrates of radioisotopes may provide suitable formulations for experiments requiring sources of particular types of radiation; hence. 85Kr clathrate provides a safe source of beta particles, while 133Xe clathrate provides a useful source of gamma rays.

References

Resources

 
N